Stin Avli Tou Paradeisou is the sixth studio album by Greek singer Despina Vandi. It was released in Greece on 24 November 2004 by Heaven Music and certified platinum, selling over 40,000 units. It was re-released with four new songs and a bonus DVD, and renamed Special Edition: Stin Avli Tou Paradeisou on 7 December 2005. With the combination of both releases, the album certified double-platinum in Greece.

Stin Avli Tou Paradeisou and its re-release Special Edition: Stin Avli Tou Paradeisou won Despina Vandi six awards over two years at Mad Video Music Awards. The first three awards were given to Vandi at the 2005 awards while the second three were awarded at the 2006 awards. Having won three each year made Vandi the artist with the most awards at both award shows.

Track listing

Singles and music videos
"Happy End"

"Happy End" was the lead single from the album. The music video was directed by Kostas Kapetanidis and won a MAD Video Music Award for "Best Contemporary Laiko Video".

"Na Tin Hairesai"

"Na Ti Hairesai" was the second single from the album. The music video was directed by Kostas Kapetanidis.

"Stin Avli Tou Paradeisou"

"Stin Avli Tou Paradeisou" was the third and final single from the original album. The animated music video was directed by Kostas Kapetanidis and won MAD Video Music Awards for "Best Contemporary Laiko Video" and "Best Direction".

"Jambi"

"Jambi was the fourth single from the album and the first from the Special Edition. The music video was directed by Kostas Kapetanidis.

"Amane"

"Amane" was the fifth and final single from the album and is a blend of contemporary laiko and hip hop in a vocal duet between Vandi and Giorgos Mazonakis. The music video was directed by Nikos Soulis, and also features actress Katiana Balanika.

Release history

Charts
Stin Avli Tou Paradeisou was successful in Greece, where it charted for 58 weeks, peaking at number 1, certifying platinum in its first week of release. It soon certified double-platinum and also certified platinum in Cyprus.

Credits and personnel

Personnel 
Hakan Bingolou: oud (tracks: 7) || säz (tracks: 7, 9)

Giannis Bithikotsis: baglama (tracks: 2, 5, 6, 10, 11) || bouzouki (tracks: 2, 5, 6, 10, 11, 12) || lute (tracks: 1) || tzoura (tracks: 1, 2, 3, 5, 6, 10, 11, 12)

Victoria Chalkiti: backing vocals (tracks: 1, 2, 5, 9, 11)

Giorgos Chatzopoulos: guitars (tracks: 1, 2, 3, 4, 5, 6, 7, 9, 10, 11, 12)

Akis Diximos: second vocal (tracks: 1, 2, 3, 4, 5, 6, 7, 9, 10)

Nektarios Georgiadis: backing vocals (tracks: 1, 2, 9, 11)

Antonis Gounaris: guitars, keyboards, orchestration, programming, tzoura (tracks: 8)

Manolis Karantinis: baglama, bouzouki, tzoura (tracks: 4)

Lefki Kolovou: cello (tracks: 11)

Trifon Koutsourelis: keyboards, programming (all tracks) || orchestration (tracks: 2, 4, 5, 6, 7, 9, 10, 11, 12) || strings arrangement (tracks: 11)

Vaggelis Lappas: whistle (tracks: 2)

Fedon Lionoudakis: accordion (tracks: 2, 3, 4, 9, 10, 11, 12)

Iris Louka: viola (tracks: 11)

Selmani Migken: violin (tracks: 2, 4, 10, 11)

Andreas Mouzakis: drums (tracks: 1, 2, 3, 4, 7, 10, 12)

Hakan Bingolou: oud (tracks: 7) / säz (tracks: 7, 9)

Alex Panagis: backing vocals (tracks: 1, 9, 11)

Phoebus: keyboards (tracks: 1, 3, 4, 5, 8) || orchestration (tracks: 1, 2, 3, 4, 5, 7, 8, 9, 10, 11, 12) || programming (tracks: 1, 3, 5, 8)

Giorgos Roilos: percussion (tracks: 1, 3, 5, 6, 7, 8, 9, 11, 12)

Nikos Vardis: bass (tracks: 1, 3, 7)

Thanasis Vasilopoulos: clarinet, ney (tracks: 7, 9)

Martha Zioga: backing vocals (tracks: 1, 2, 9, 11)

Production 
Giannis Ioannidis (D.P.H.): mastering

Dimitris Mourlas: sound engineer

Vaggelis Papadopoulos: sound engineer

Panagiotis Petronikolos: mix engineer, sound engineer

Phoebus: executive producer

Vaggelis Siapatis: editing, sound engineer

Giorgos Stampolis: executive producer

Christos Zorbas: additional editing

Cover 
Bill Georgousis: cover photographer

Panos Kallitsis: hair styling, make up

Kostas Lalas: studio photographer

Alexis Valourdos: photo processing

Credits adapted from the album's liner notes.

References

Albums produced by Phoebus (songwriter)
Despina Vandi albums
2004 albums
2005 albums
Greek-language albums
Heaven Music albums